The Bee Ridge Woman's Club is a historic woman's club in Sarasota, Florida, United States. The club was founded in 1915 as the Get-Together-Club and took its name as Bee Ridge Woman's club in 1917. In 1922 construction began on a clubhouse and the building was completed in 1923. It is located at 4919 Andrew Avenue. On February 10, 1995, it was added to the U.S. National Register of Historic Places.

See also
 List of Registered Historic Woman's Clubhouses in Florida

References

National Register of Historic Places in Sarasota County, Florida
Buildings and structures in Sarasota, Florida
Women's clubs in Florida
Women's club buildings in Florida